Flag of Convenience were a rock group formed in 1982 by former Buzzcocks members Steve Diggle and John Maher, along with bassist Dave Farrow and keyboard player D.P. Through their first two line-ups they were managed by the writer and music critic Michael Gray, shortly after his personal management of Gerry Rafferty. Hence the band's first single was produced by Rafferty's co-producer Hugh Murphy. The band continued with changing line-ups until 1989, with later incarnations releasing records under the names F.O.C. and Buzzcocks F.O.C. The final incarnation of the band included former member of The Stone Roses Andy Couzens and former Inspiral Carpets drummer Chris Goodwin, who both went on to form The High. The band ended when Diggle joined Pete Shelley in a re-formed Buzzcocks, the reunion prompted by controversy over the use of "Buzzcocks" in the billing of Diggle's band.

In a review of the 'best of' compilation The Secret Public Years 1981-1989, Allmusic described the later F.O.C. work as proof that Diggle was "one of the most important and overlooked artists in all of Britain during the '80s".

Discography

Singles
"Life on the Telephone" (1982) Sire
"Change" (1984) Weird Systems
"New House" (1986) M.C.M.
"Last Train to Safety" (1987) Flag of Convenience
"Should I Ever Go Deaf" (1987) M.C.M. (as F.O.C.)
"Exiles" (1988) M.C.M. (as F.O.C.)
"Tomorrow's Sunset" (1989) Thin Line (as Buzzcocks F.O.C.)
"Heated and Rising" (1993) 3:30 (as Steve Diggle & the Flag of Convenience)

Albums
Northwest Skyline (1987) M.C.M.
War on the Wireless Set (1988) MCM America
Here's One I Made Earlier (1995) Ax-s (as Steve Diggle & the Flag of Convenience)
The Best of Steve Diggle and Flag of Convenience - The Secret Public Years 1981-1989 (2000) Anagram

References

Musical groups from Manchester
Musical groups established in 1982
Musical groups disestablished in 1989
English alternative rock groups
English new wave musical groups
1982 establishments in England